Chester Field, located in Beaufort County, South Carolina, is one of the nearly two dozen prehistoric shell rings that run from the center coast of South Carolina to the central coast of Georgia. Archaeologists date the pottery that has been found at these sites to be in the second millennium BC, this placing the artifacts among the earliest pottery of North America. The purpose or use of the ring shape is not known. This “address restricted” site was listed in the National Register of Historic Places on October 15, 1970.

References

Geography of Beaufort County, South Carolina
Archaeological sites on the National Register of Historic Places in South Carolina
National Register of Historic Places in Beaufort County, South Carolina
Shell rings